Robert Dwayne McGerrigle (born 12 March 1980) is a former Irish cricketer.  McGerrigle is a right-handed batsman who bowls right-arm medium pace.  He was born at Derry, Northern Ireland.

McGerrigle made twelve Youth One Day International appearances for Ireland Under-19s, appearing in the 1998 Under-19 World Cup and the 2000 Under-19 World Cup.  He made a single first-class appearance for Ireland against Scotland at Ormeau, Belfast in 1999.  He took 4 wickets for 24 runs in Scotland's first-innings, while in their second-innings he took the wicket of Drew Parsons.  He batted once in the match and was dismissed for a duck by Asim Butt.  He made his List A debut for Ireland against Northumberland in the 1999 NatWest Trophy, taking 5/66 in an Irish victory.  He played two further List A matches, both in the 1999 NatWest Trophy against the Essex Cricket Board and Leicestershire.  He took a total of 7 wickets in his three matches, which came at an average of 22.71.

He still plays club cricket in Northern Ireland for Donemana Cricket Club.

References

External links
Dwayne McGerrigle at ESPNcricinfo
Dwayne McGerrigle at CricketArchive

1980 births
Living people
Sportspeople from Derry (city)
Irish cricketers
Cricketers from Northern Ireland